Sir Alexander Morris Carr-Saunders,  (14 January 1886 – 6 October 1966) was an English biologist, sociologist, academic, and academic administrator. He was Director of the London School of Economics from 1937 to 1957.

Early life
Carr-Saunders was born on 14 January 1886 in Reigate, Surrey, England. He was educated at Eton College, an all-boys public school in Eton, Berkshire. He then studied biology at Magdalen College, specialising in zoology. He graduated from the University of Oxford with a first class honours Bachelor of Arts (BA) degree in 1908.

Career

Early career
Carr-Saunders remained a year at the University of Oxford as a demonstrator in comparative anatomy. He left in 1910 to join the University College London where he studied biometrics under Karl Pearson. Deciding against natural science, he instead read for the Bar of the Inner Temple.

Concerned about all kinds of social ills and problems, he saw a solution in Eugenics for the engineering of society into a better condition. He became the secretary of the Eugenics Education Society and lived at Toynbee Hall.

Military service
When World War I broke out in 1914, he attempted to obtain a commission in the London Scottish Regiment, but was instead commissioned into the Royal Army Service Corps. He spent the first year of the war in France on the Western Front. He was then posted to a ration depot at Suez, Egypt, due to the high standard of his French. He was promoted to temporary lieutenant on 12 December 1914, and to temporary captain on 27 January 1918.

Later career
After the Armistice he returned to the Zoology department of the University of Oxford, taking an interest in ecological issues, especially population and overpopulation. He participated in one of the firsts Oxford Expeditions to Spitsbergen in the Arctic in 1921 as main scientists, together with Julian Huxley. During the expedition he distilled his early ideas on population dynamics and summarized them in a book called The Population Problem. The book used a neo-Malthusian argument plus Galton's eugenics as the theoretical framework for a quantitative analysis of population dynamics. The population problem arose -according to Carr-Saunders analysis- from the fact of having high reproductive rates among primitive people with low mental and physical qualities. Over-population of these lower races endangered the standard of living of races bearing higher qualities. Unlike Malthus, he thought that industrial productivity and not food was the main limiting factor in human populations.

The success of his magnum opus The Population Problem resulted in his appointment to the Charles Booth Chair of Social Science at the University of Liverpool in 1923. In 1936, he was appointed the first Chair of the Population Investigation Committee. In 1937, he was appointed to succeed Sir William Beveridge as Director of the London School of Economics, and held that post until his retirement in 1955. He served on the Royal Commission on Population, in 1944–1949. He served as President of the Geographical Association (who held their Annual Conferences at LSE for many decades) during 1947. In 1947 he further served as chairman of the commission which recommended the establishment of the University of Malaya.

Carr-Saunders was one of the mentors of the animal ecologist Charles Elton, greatly influencing Elton's approach toward animal ecology as a "sociology and economy of animals"

Honours
For his military service during World War I, Carr-Saunders was awarded three medals; the 1914 Star or 1914–15 Star, the British War Medal, and the Victory Medal.

In the 1946 New Year Honours, Carr-Saunders was appointed a Knight Bachelor (Kt) in recognition of his role as Director of the London School of Economics and Political Science, and therefore granted the title sir. On 12 March 1946, he was knighted by King George VI during a ceremony at Buckingham Palace. In 1946, he was also elected a Fellow of the British Academy (FBA), and awarded the first Galton medal by the Eugenics Society. In the 1957 New Year Honours, he was appointed a Knight Commander of the Order of the British Empire (KBE) "for services as Director of the London School of Economics".

References

External links

English eugenicists
Knights Bachelor
Military personnel from Surrey
Knights Commander of the Order of the British Empire
Fellows of the British Academy
British Army personnel of World War I
Royal Army Service Corps officers
1886 births
1966 deaths
People educated at Eton College
People associated with the London School of Economics
People from Reigate
Alumni of Magdalen College, Oxford
Alumni of University College London
British sociologists
Place of death missing